Dirca mexicana, the Mexican leatherwood, is a low shrub with a very restricted population in Tamaulipas, Mexico. However, it does surprisingly well in the much colder environment of Ames, Iowa. Like most Dirca species, it blooms in early spring.

Habitat
Mexican leatherwood grows in forested karstic limestone terrain at an elevation of about 1800 meters. It is shaded mainly by large Douglas-fir, shagbark hickory, Mexican weeping pine and laurinate oak. Some musclewood and American sweetgum are also present.

References

Kelly D. Norris and William R. Graves (2012). A Narrowly Endemic Dirca from Mexico Outperforms Its Broadly Distributed Congener in the Upper Midwest. American Society for Horticultural Science https://doi.org/10.21273/HORTSCI.47.10.1445

NESOM, GUY L., and MARK H. MAYFIELD. “A NEW SPECIES OF DIRCA (THYMELAEACEAE) FROM THE SIERRA OF NORTHEASTERN MEXICO.” SIDA, Contributions to Botany, vol. 16, no. 3, 1995, pp. 459–67, http://www.jstor.org/stable/41967148. Accessed 11 May 2022.

Endemic flora of Mexico
Plants described in 1995
Thymelaeoideae
Flora of the Sierra Madre Oriental